Frank La Rocca (born in 1951 in New Jersey) is an American classical music composer.

Life
Frank La Rocca was born in 1951 in New Jersey. He studied at Yale and at the University of California at Berkeley. His early musical experiences ranged from classical piano to playing electronic keyboards in various rock and blues bands. He began composing at age 14. His teachers included Edwin Dugger, Olly Wilson, Andrew Imbrie, Jonathan Kramer, Frank Lewin and John Mauceri. He has received grants and awards from the National Endowment for the Arts and the California Arts Council, and a Young Composers Award from ASCAP. He was a 2018 American Prize winner for the oratorio, "A Rose in Winter – the life of St. Rita of Cascia".

Trained as an academic modernist during his degree studies at Yale and University of California, Berkeley, La Rocca came to see this approach as a barrier to authentic musical expression, and spent many years in search of a personal creative language.

A composer of works for both the concert stage and liturgy, one finds considerable common ground between these two in works like Veni Sancte Spiritus, for soprano, clarinet and baroque string quartet. La Rocca regards himself in the role of "an apologist for a distinctively Christian faith – not through direct persuasion, but through the beauty of music". He was named Composer-in-Residence at the Benedict XVI Institute for Sacred Music and Liturgy in 2018.

La Rocca has been awarded several times for outstanding achievements as a professor of music California State University, East Bay.

La Rocca's music has been performed in North America, Europe, China, Japan, Korea, Australia, New Zealand, Argentina and Uganda. Performers include the California Symphony, Oakland Symphony, Lumen Valo, soprano Christine Brandes, Strata, Artists Vocal Ensemble, Schola Cantorum of the London Oratory School, Young Women's Chorus of San Francisco, Cathedral Choral Society, San Francisco Girls Chorus, Prague Radio – Choir and Orchestra, Alexander String Quartet and others . His music is published by Boosey & Hawkes, Walton Music, Santa Barbara Music Publishers and Lumen Verum Music.

He is recorded on Cappella Records, Enharmonic Records, CRI, CRS, SCI, and ERM Media. Cappella's 2022 release of Mass of the Americas, produced by 11-time Grammy Award-winner Blanton Alspaugh, was in the Billboard Top Ten Traditional Classical albums for 2022.

Frank La Rocca taught music theory and composition at California State University, East Bay from 1981–2014.

Choral works
Missa Pange Lingua (2020) for Choir SATB, optional sackbut consort
There is no Rose of Such Vertu (2020) for Choir SSAA
Missa Sancte Ioseph (2018) for Choir SATB
Remember Me (2017) for Choir SATB
Tantum Ergo (2017) for Choir SATB
Ave Verum Corpus II (2017) for Choir SATB
Ne Irascaris Domine (2016) for Choir SSAATTBB
Ave Maria II (2015) for Choir SATB
Qui Creavit Caelum (2015) for Choir SSAA and Violoncello
Anima Christi (2014) for Choir SSATBB
Tread Softly (2014) for Choir SSAATB
Ego Sum Pastor Bonus (2013) for Choir SATB
Diffusa Est Gratia (2012) SATB choir
Ave Maris Stella (2012) for Women's Choir
Nunc Dimittis (2012) for Women's Choir
O Sacrum Convivium (2011) for Choir SATB†
Iam Lucis Orto Sidere (2010) for Women's Choir
Credo (2010) for Choir SATB†
Ave Maria (2009) for Choir SATB
The Divine Image (2008) for Choir SSAATTBB 
Ave Verum Corpus (2008) for Choir SATB
Alleluia (2007) for Choir SATB, Organ and Brass (ad lib.)
O Eve (2007) for Choir SATB and SSAA
Cantate Domino (2006) for Choir SATB and Orchestra (or Organ)
Sicut Cervus (2005) for Choir SATB
O Nata Lux (2005) for Choir SATB and String Orchestra
Resurrection Prelude (2005), for Choir SATB, Organ, Brass, and Timpani
Miserere (2004) for Choir SATB†
Echo (2004) for Women's Choir
O Magnum Mysterium (2003) for Choir SATB†
Ubi Caritas (2003) for Choir SATB 
O Vos Omnes (2003) for Choir SATB
Eli, Eli (2003) for Choir SATB and Organ
Magnificat (2002) for Women's Choir
Psalm 23 (2002) for Choir SATB
Expectavi Dominum (2001) for mixed Choir†
In the Beginning (2000) for mixed Choir
Exaudi (1998) for mixed Choir

†recorded on Enharmonic CD 12-025 "IN THIS PLACE"

Liturgical Works 
Messe des Malades (2022) for Choir SATB and organ
Missa Sancti Juníperi Serra (2022) for Choir SATB, baroque flute and string ensemble, organ
Requiem for the Homeless (2020) for Choir SATB, low strings, organ and harp
 Missa Pange Lingua (2020) for Choir SATB, optional sackbut consort
Mass of the Americas (2018) for Choir SATB, organ, string ensemble, guitar and marimba
Missa Sancte Ioseph (2018) for Choir SATB
Tantum Ergo (2017) for Choir SATB
Ave Verum Corpus II (2017) for Choir SATB
Ne Irascaris Domine (2016) for Choir SSAATTBB
Ave Maria II (2015) for Choir SATB
Missa Papae Benedicti XVI (2012) SATB choir and organ
Missa Cordi Sacro (2010) SATB choir and organ
Ego Sum Pastor Bonus (2013) for Choir SATB
In the Splendor of the Holy Ones (2013) SATB choir
Behold, a Virgin Shall Conceive (2013) SATB choir
This is the Body (2013) SATB choir
He Who Ponders the Law of the Lord (2013) SATB choir
Christ, our Passover (2013) SATB choir
Laudate Dominum (2013) SATB choir
Diffusa Est Gratia (2012) SATB choir
O Sacrum Convivium (2011) for Choir SATB
Ave Verum Corpus (2008) for Choir SATB
Sicut Cervus (2005) for Choir SATB
Miserere (2004) for Choir SATB†
O Magnum Mysterium (2003) for Choir SATB†

Chamber music

Veni Sancte Spiritus (2001) for Soprano, Clarinet, Baroque String Quartet†
In This Place (2000) for Clarinet, Violin and Piano†
†recorded on Enharmonic CD 12-025 "IN THIS PLACE"
Precipice (1997) for String Quartet
Meditation (1991) Piano solo
Divertimento (1990) for two pianos
Secret Thoughts (1986) for Cello solo
Recorded on CRI SD 567
Canti d'Innocenza (1984) for Soprano, Clarinet, Harp and Vibraphone
Recorded on CRS 8944.
Frammenti (1983) for Piano solo
Duo Lirico (1982) for Violin and Viola
String Trio (1981) for Violin, Viola and Cello
Recorded on CRI SD 567
Fantasy for Violin and Piano (1979)
Phoenix (1976) for Clarinet, String Quartet, Piano and Percussion
Night Music (1975) for Violin and Piano

Major vocal works
A Rose in Winter - the life of St. Rita of Cascia (2015) for chorus, orchestra, soloists and organ, libretto by Matthew Lickona 90'
In a Dark Time (1989) for Choir SATB and Chamber Ensemble 20'
The Pure Fury (1988) for Tenor and large Chamber Ensemble 25'

Orchestra works

Veni Sancte Spiritus (2001) for Soprano, Clarinet and String Orchestra
While Orpheus Dreamed (1998) for Orchestra
The Right Road Lost (1996) for large Orchestra
Crossing the Rubicon (1994) for Orchestra
No Strings (1993) for Symphonic Band
The Pure Fury (1989) for Tenor and Chamber Orchestra
Chen (1977) Prologue for Orchestra

Electronic music and film scores

Labyrinth (1977) for tape
Newsical Muse (1975) contributor to Live-Radio Theater piece by Neil B. Rolnick
Emergency (1974) Music for a Documentary Film
Krystallos (1973) Music for a Documentary Film

External links

References

1951 births
Living people
20th-century classical composers
American male classical composers
American classical composers
American people of Italian descent
Yale University alumni
University of California, Berkeley alumni
California State University, East Bay faculty
20th-century American composers
20th-century American male musicians